Narud is a Norwegian surname. Notable people with the surname include:

 Hanne Marthe Narud (1958–2012), Norwegian political scientist
 Ole Gustav Narud (born 1958), Norwegian politician
 Odd Narud (1919–2000), Norwegian businessman

Norwegian-language surnames